The Last Contract is a 1998 Swedish thriller film directed by Kjell Sundvall. It is a work of fiction about the circumstances surrounding the actual murder of the Swedish Social Democratic Prime Minister Olof Palme on 28 February 1986. A Swedish police officer (played by Mikael Persbrandt) discovers the plan to assassinate Palme and tries to prevent it. The film also stars Pernilla August, Reine Brynolfsson and Cecilia Ljung.
 
The film is based on a novel by an anonymous writer, who used the pseudonym "John W. Grow", which suggests that a British professional assassin (played by Michael Kitchen) was hired to kill Olof Palme.

Plot 
The film suggests that a British professional hit-man was hired by the CIA to assassinate the Swedish Prime Minister Olof Palme, because of Palme's stance on nuclear weapons in Scandinavia. The hit-man (Michael Kitchen) works for money alone and is very careful. He finds a Norwegian man (Bjørn Floberg) that hates the Swedish P.M. He also involves a man to be blamed (this character is Christer Pettersson, first convicted (by a disagreeing court 
) of the real assassination, but later acquitted in the appealing court. The Norwegian man kills Palme just as his wife notices Christer Pettersson. Soon afterwards the hitman kills the killer, and all traces pointing to the professional hitman are gone.

Cast
Mikael Persbrandt ... Roger Nyman, the secret police
Michael Kitchen ... John Gales alias Ray Lambert, the professional who assassinates the hit-man in order to clean up.
Pernilla August ... Nina Nyman, Roger Nyman's wife
Reine Brynolfsson ... Bo Ekman, police officer and Roger Nyman's best friend
Bjørn Floberg ... Tom Nielsen, the Palme assassin, who is then killed himself by John Gales alias Ray Lambert.
Jacqueline Ramel ... Helene Salonen, of the secret police
Cecilia Ljung ... Lisa Holmgren, journalist
Joakim Forslund ... Markus Nyman, Roger's child
Julia Brådhe-Dehnisch ... Josefin Nyman (as Julia Dehnisch)
Agnes Granberg ... Sara Nyman, Roger's child
Johan Lindell ... Bernhard Lange, of the secret police
Mathias Henrikson ... Peter Bark
Donald Högberg ... Appelqvist, of the secret police
Per Ragnar ... kg, of the secret police
Paul Birchard ... Bertram Norris
Anders Ekborg ... Bengt Löfgren
Leif Andrée ... Max Berg, the corrupt journalist
Ola Isedal ... Karl Larsson, the drug addict
Stephen Webber ... Wilson, the American
Stig Engström ... Bartender at the press club
Emil Forselius ... The Robber
Claudia Galli ... Shop Assistant
Tshamano Sebe ... Ery Sontanga, the African
Faith Maqoqa ... Judy Sontanga, the African
Bankole Omotoso ... Luwamba
Dipuo Huma ... Lambert's cleaning lady
Stephan Karlsén ... Arkivman
Sven-Åke Wahlström ... Palmehatare
Lasse Petterson ... Palmehatare
Berndt Östman ... Portier (as Bernt Östman)
Roger S. Karlsson ... Guard
Bo Bertil Lundqvist ... Statsministern

References

Notes

External links

Variety 

1998 films
1998 crime thriller films
Films directed by Kjell Sundvall
Films set in 1985
Assassination of Olof Palme
1990s Swedish-language films
Swedish crime thriller films
Films set in 1986
1990s Swedish films